Flå Church may refer to:

Flå Church, Buskerud, a church in Flå municipality in Buskerud county, Norway
Flå Church, Trøndelag, a church in Melhus municipality in Trøndelag county, Norway

See also
Flå (disambiguation)